Y Dydd Olaf (meaning "the last day") is the first solo album by Welsh singer-songwriter Gwenno. It was her fifth solo release after four previous EPs.

Background
The album was initially released on a small scale by the independent Peski Records label in October 2014 and sold out completely. It was re-released worldwide in 2015 by Heavenly Recordings. The album was an attempt by Gwenno to combine her political views with sounds she loves and was inspired in part by a dystopian science fiction book of the same name by Owain Owain which was released in 1976. Since the album was released, permission for an English translation of Owain's book was granted, 40 years after it was first published in Welsh. The album is sung predominantly in Welsh with the final track, Amser, being a musical rendition of a Cornish poem by her father, Tim Saunders. Gwenno has said she used the book's title as it had inspired her to return to singing in her first language.

The album began as a collection of recordings of everyday sounds Gwenno had collected over a number of years, including field recordings in Cardiff Bay. She sampled these sounds to create rhythm tracks and built the songs up from there, saying she "really wanted to get to the bottom of the idea of creating a soundscape before coming up with any sort of song" and has said she aims to use "less music to make more".

Reception

The album received critical acclaim and won the Welsh Music Prize and the Welsh-language album of the Year in 2015. It was also chosen by readers of Y Selar, a Welsh music magazine, as the 4th best album of 2014, and by Allmusic as one of the best Indie Records of 2015. London's Loud and Quiet called it the second best album of 2015.

Track listing
Source: 
All tracks written by Gwenno.

Release history

References

2015 albums
Heavenly Recordings albums
Welsh-language albums
Gwenno albums